Öllölä is a village in Joensuu, Finland. The village is located in the former municipality of Tuupovaara, which has been consolidated into Joensuu. Öllölä was selected Finland's village of the year in 1994. In Öllölä there is a shop and a school, which offers lodging and eating.

The earliest records of the village date back to 1637.

References

Villages in Finland
Joensuu